Carolyn Gallaher is an American academic who is a political geographer and associate professor at the American University School of International Service. Her scholarship is focused on the role of paramilitaries in irregular warfare and the influence of the religious right in U.S. foreign policy.

Gallaher earned a Bachelor of Arts degree from the University of Mary Washington, a Master of Arts from Miami University, and a PhD from the University of Kentucky.

Selected published works

References

Living people
American University faculty and staff
University of Kentucky alumni
Kentucky women in politics
Kentucky women in education
Year of birth missing (living people)
American women non-fiction writers
American women academics
21st-century American women
University of Mary Washington alumni
Miami University alumni